Zakharovite is a mineral, a silicate of sodium and manganese; formula  Na4Mn5Si10O24(OH)6·6H2O.   It has a yellow colour with a pearly lustre.  Discovered in 1982 in the Kola peninsula of Northern Russia, it is named after Evgeny Evgenevich Zakharov (1902–1980), the director of the Moscow Institute of Geological Exploration.

See also
List of minerals
List of minerals named after people

References

Webmineral data

Sodium minerals
Manganese(II) minerals
Phyllosilicates
Geology of Russia
Trigonal minerals